Non ti pago! is a 1942 Italian comedy film directed by Carlo Ludovico Bragaglia, who also adapted the play by Eduardo De Filippo, the star of the film. It was shown as part of a retrospective on Italian comedy at the 67th Venice International Film Festival.

Cast
 Eduardo De Filippo - Don Ferdinando Quagliolo
 Titina De Filippo - Concetta Quagliolo
 Peppino De Filippo - Procopio Bertolini
 Vanna Vanni - Stella Quagliolo
 Paolo Stoppa - The attorney Lorenzo Strumillo
 Giorgio De Rege - Aglitiello, il consulente della cabala
 Vasco Creti - Don Raffaele, il parroco
 Italia Marchesini - Zia Erminia
 Ernesto Bianchi - Uno dei fratelli Cingallegra
 Aristide Garbini - L'uomo derubato
 Lina Marengo - Una impiegata del banco del lotto
 Dolores Palumbo - Carmela
 Rosita Pisano - Una giocatrice al lotto
 Margherita Pisano - L'altra giocatrice al lotto

References

External links

1942 films
1942 comedy films
Italian comedy films
1940s Italian-language films
Italian black-and-white films
Films based on works by Eduardo De Filippo
Films set in Naples
Films directed by Carlo Ludovico Bragaglia
1940s Italian films